Parliamentary elections were held in Nauru on 25 August 2007. There were more than 80 candidates for the 18 seats available. Fifteen MPs were reelected, among them fourteen supporters of Ludwig Scotty's government; the only opposition politician to be reelected was René Harris. Of the three seats which changed hands, two were losses for the opposition and one was a gain; all in all, fifteen members are pro-government and only three are opposition members.

Results

References

Elections in Nauru
Nauru
Parliamentary election
Election and referendum articles with incomplete results